"An Amateur in Love" is a song co-written and originally recorded by Slim Whitman.

Track listing

References 

1952 songs
1957 singles
1952 singles
London Records singles
Imperial Records singles
Slim Whitman songs